Einzelgänger is a 1975 electronic experimental album composed, produced and performed by Giorgio Moroder. It was first released in Germany.

As described by music critic Simon Reynolds, the album "teems with pitter-pattering drum machine beats and unsettling processed vocal-stutters that recall the ethereal whimsy of early Kraftwerk", and foreshadowed Moroder's work two years later on I Feel Love, a pioneering track for electronic disco music.

Track listing

"Einzelgänger (Lone Wolf)" - 4:37
"Aus (The End)" - 6:52
"Warum (Why)" - 3:08
"Percussiv" - 3:58
"Good Old Germany" - 5:08
"Basslich" - 2:50
"Untergang (Ruin)" - 5:10
"Liebes-Arie (Love Song)" - 4:48
"Einzelganger" - 1:54

References

Giorgio Moroder albums
1975 albums
Albums produced by Giorgio Moroder
Casablanca Records albums